New Castle Airport may refer to:

 Wilmington-Philadelphia Regional Airport (formerly New Castle Airport) and New Castle Air National Guard Base in New Castle County, Delaware, United States (FAA/IATA: ILG)
 New Castle Municipal Airport near New Castle, Pennsylvania, United States (FAA: UCP)
 New Castle-Henry County Municipal Airport in New Castle, Indiana, United States (FAA: UWL)

See also
 Newcastle Airport (disambiguation)